This article lists managers of Southend United Football Club in chronological order.

References

 http://www.managerstats.co.uk/clubs/southend-united/

Southend United F.C.
Southend United F.C. managers
Southend United